Hamel is a village in Madison County, Illinois, United States. The population was 929 at the 2020 census, up from 816 in 2010. It is a part of the Illinois Metro East portion of the Greater St. Louis metropolitan area.

Geography
Hamel is located in northeastern Madison County at  (38.887524, -89.843949). Interstate 55 passes through the east side of the village, leading southwest  to St. Louis and north  to Springfield, the Illinois capital. Illinois Route 140 passes through the center of Hamel as State Street, leading east  to Greenville and west  to Alton.

Hamel is drained to the south by tributaries of Silver Creek, a south-flowing tributary of the Kaskaskia River.

Demographics

As of the census of 2000, there were 570 people, 233 households, and 170 families living in the village. The racial makeup of the village was 98.25% White, 0.35% from other races, and 1.40% from two or more races. Hispanic or Latino of any race were 0.53% of the population.

There were 233 households, out of which 31.3% had children under the age of 18 living with them, 63.5% were married couples living together, 8.2% had a female householder with no husband present, and 27.0% were non-families. 24.5% of all households were made up of individuals, and 10.7% had someone living alone who was 65 years of age or older. The average household size was 2.45 and the average family size was 2.92.

In the village, the population was spread out, with 24.2% under the age of 18, 6.1% from 18 to 24, 31.8% from 25 to 44, 21.6% from 45 to 64, and 16.3% who were 65 years of age or older. The median age was 37 years. For every 100 females, there were 91.9 males. For every 100 females age 18 and over, there were 85.4 males.

The median income for a household in the village was $45,750, and the median income for a family was $55,694. Males had a median income of $41,023 versus $24,028 for females. The per capita income for the village was $19,062. About 4.0% of families and 3.6% of the population were below the poverty line, including 3.2% of those under age 18 and 5.5% of those age 65 or over.

See also

 List of municipalities in Illinois

References

External links 

 

Villages in Madison County, Illinois
Villages in Illinois